Robert J. Keller was a member of the Wisconsin State Assembly.

Biography
Keller was born on November 9, 1893, in Baraboo, Wisconsin. During World War I, he served with the 29th Infantry Division of the United States Army.

Political career
Keller was a member of the Assembly during the 1929 and 1931 sessions. Additionally, he was Clerk and Attorney of the Village of Sauk City, Wisconsin.

References

People from Baraboo, Wisconsin
Republican Party members of the Wisconsin State Assembly
Wisconsin lawyers
Military personnel from Wisconsin
United States Army personnel of World War I
1893 births
Year of death missing
People from Sauk City, Wisconsin